Henryk Skarzynski (born 1954) is a Polish doctor otolaryngologist, audiologist and phoniatrist, creator and director of Warsaw Institute of Physiology and Pathology of Hearing and World Hearing Center in Kajetany.

Professor Skarzynski is the author and co-author of numerous scientific works, he is a supervisor of PhD dissertations, member of scientific and foreign associations. He performed the first operation of cochlear implantation in Poland and Central Europe in 1992, restoring hearing ability to a partially deaf adult. Skarzynski calls this procedure "partial deafness cochlear implantation".  He later performed the same procedure on a child in 2004.

Biography 
He graduated in 1979 with a Doctor of Medicine from the Medical Faculty of Medical Academy of Warsaw. He went to receive a PhD in medicine in 1983, and a habilitated PhD in 1989. He was made 
professor extraordinarius at the Medical Academy of Warsaw in 1993, and full Professor of Medicine in 1995. He was granted three honorary titles of doctor honoris causa - the Maria Grzegorowska Academy of Special Education in Warsaw in 2011, University of Warsaw and 2012 and Maria Curie Skłodowska University in Lublin in 2014.

Achievements

Professional
 1992 - Implementation of deafness treatment program in Poland using cochlear implants.
 1998 - Implementation of deafness and cancer lesions treatment program in Poland using brain stem implants.
 1998 - Implementation of early detection of hearing loss in newborns and infants program in Poland.
 1999 - globally original program of universal hearing, speech and vision tests on the Internet.
 2002 - July 12 the world's first cochlear implant surgery in an adult patient with partial deafness.
 2003 - Poland's first cochlear implant surgery for middle ear. Dozens of new clinical procedures.
 2004 - September - the first operation in the world of a child with partial hearing loss.

Scientific
 2001 - development of new, original ways of the middle ear reconstructive surgery with the use of alloplastic materials (glass ionomers)
 2002 - development of new diagnostic tools - audiometer Kuba Mikro
 2002 – development of PDCI (Partial Deafness cochlear implantation) - unique in the world method of partial deafness treatment (PDT - Partial Deafness Treatment) that allows to correct the comfort of hearing using cochlear implant maintaining the present hearing.

Medical
 2000 - development of the tasks assigned by the Minister of Health, worldly original multimedia programs for early detection of hearing, speech and vision defects.
 2004 - development of telemedicine program: Home Rehabilitation Clinic
 2005 - development of new device for universal hearing screening - Audiometer S
 2005 - the first linkage of the implant and hearing aid in one ear
 2007 - Telefitting - development of the world's first permanent system of remote supervision over the working process and ability to set the implant in patients wherever they are
 2009 - development of the world's first device, "Sense Examination Platform" that evaluates the damage of hearing, speech and vision in screening

Organizational 
 2008 - the world's first bilateral hearing implantation to the brainstem
 1993 - Founder of Diagnostic-Medical-Rehabilitation Center for the Deaf and Hard-of-hearing people "Cochlear Center" - the second facility in Europe
 1996 - Creator and director of Institute of Physiology and Pathology of Hearing in Warsaw
 2003 – Creator and founder of the International Centre of Hearing and Speech in Kajetany
 2012 – Organizer of World Hearing Center w Kajetany

Awards, distinctions and honours 

 
 1983 - 2000 the award of the Rector of the Medical Academy in Warsaw to Professor Henryk Skarżyński (four times)
 1983 -  Scientific Award of the Board of the Polish Society of ENT Head and Neck Surgeons under the name of prof. Jan Miodoński
 1985 -  Polish National Scientific Competition Award under the name of Tytus Chałubiński
 1993 -
 Polish Business Club Award for prof. H. Skarżyński for "Medical event in 1992"
 The title "Varsovian of the Year 1992" ("Warszawiak Roku 1992") for the event of the year awarded to prof. H. Skarzynski by the readers of the Evening Express and viewers of the Warsaw Television Center
 1994 - Award "Honorary Silver Ace" ("Honorowy Srebrny As") granted by Polish Promotion Corporation
 2000 – Award by Committee for Scientific Research and television research journal "Proton" for outstanding scientific achievements - "The program of cochlear brainstem implantation in Poland"
 2000 - Order Odrodzenia Polski Knight Cross
 2002 - "Eskulap 2001″ award in the category "specialist physician" in the Mazovian Voivodeship awarded by Polish Nationwide Health Information Network and Mazovian Sickness Fund
 2003
 Award of the Rector of AGH University of Science and Technology "Lasting Imprint" ("Trwały Ślad") to Professor Henryk Skarżynski - Director of the Institute of Physiology and Pathology of Hearing for special achievements in health care
 Prize of the City of Warsaw for prof. Henryk Skarżyński in recognition of his merits for the Capital of Republic of Poland awarded by the Council of the City of Warsaw
 Medal and the title of Innovation for presenting at the International Fair of Economy and Science INTARG 2003 innovative solution named "Screening device Kuba – Mikro" awarded by the Jury
 2004
 Medal "Gloria Medicinae" for the prof. Henryk Skarżyński granted by the Chairman of the Polish Medical Association
 Diploma "More Beautiful Poland" ("Piękniejsza Polska") by the Movement "More Beautiful Poland" under the patronage of Polish President Aleksander Kwaśniewski
 Diploma "Success of the Year 2004" - the leader of Medicine in Public Health Protection awarded by the publisher Termedia
 2005
 Officer's Cross "Merite de I'Invention" of the Kingdom of Belgium
 Award of Trust "Golden Otis 2004"
 2007
 Special prize "The Man of the Year 2007 in Healthcare"
 The title "Man of Success 2006"
 2008
 Mention of the Ministry of Education and Science of Romania awarded during the Brussels Expo - INNOVA 2008
 Officer's Cross "Labor Improdus Omnia Vincit" for scientific achievements, awarded at the Expo Brussels - INNOVA 2008
 Team Award degree I to the prof. Henryk Skarżyński
 2009
 Award "Golden Scalpel 2008"
 Award "Bene Meritum"
 2010
 Professor Henryk Skarżyński Honorary Citizen of Warsaw
 "Oscar of the Polish Business XX"
 Diploma at XLIV Congress of the Polish Society of Otorhinolaryngologists - Head and Neck Surgeons
 Mention "Golden Scalpel 2010"
 Ukrainian Order of Merit (for outstanding achievements in development of Polish-Ukrainian relationships)
 2011
 medal "For merits for FCUM"
 fifth on the List of the Hundred Most Influential People in health care in *2010
 Medal of Honor awarded by Mikheil Saakashvili (Georgia)
 Medal under the name of Dr. Titus Chałubiński
 Award Ecce Homo
 2012
 Krzyż Komandorski Order Odrodzenia Polski
 2012 − Statue of Hippocrates - awarded by Polish Association of Family Medicine
 2012 − GOlden Lider title
 2012 − Economy Award of the President of Poland awarded in the category "Innovation"
 2012 − The Outstanding Pole Title granted by The Polish Promotional Programme Foundation Teraz Polska
 2012 − Copernicus Medal awarded at the request of the Department of Medical Sciences and based on the recommendations of the Chapter of the Copernicus Medal
 2012 − Special Honorary Pearl of the Polish Economy awarded by the Polish Market
 2012 − The Honorary Polish Congress Ambassador title
 2012 − Prix Galien Elsevier Special Award in the category “Innovative IT"
 2013
 2013 − Personality of the Year 2012
 2013 − 2nd most influential person in polish healthcare system
 2013 − Medal named after Prof. Jan Nielubowicz of the Regional Medical Chamber
 2013 − Viribus Unitis medal of the Confidence Award “Gold OTIS”
 2013 - The Special Award and Medal of Prof. Zbigniew Religa awarded by the Foundation for Children „Help on Time”
 2013 - second in the ranking of Professionals of Forbes 2013 from Mazovia Region
 2013- „Poland Now” (Teraz Polska) Foundation acknowledged Prof. Henryk Skarżyński
 2013 - the Knight of the Order of the Smile
 2013 - Supervictoria in all- Poland economic plebiscite Victoria – Entrepreneurs’ Mark
 2014
 2014 - The Medal of the Warsaw University of Technology
 2014 - Crystal Dragon of Success
 2014 - Honorary Citizen of the CIty and Commune of Czyzew
 2014 - The Man of Freedom awarded on the occasion of the 25th Anniversary of Polish Freedom Day
 2014 - laureate of the plebiscite of the Ministry of Science and Higher Education "Science is Freedom"
 2014 - Special Icebreaker award

References

Bibliography
 Henryk Skarżyński: "New metod of partial deafness treatment" /in:/ Medical Science Monitor, 2003
 Henryk Skarżyński: "Zachowanie słuchu dla niskich częstotliowści u pacjentów z częściową głuchotą po wszczepieniu implantu ślimakowego" ( Preservation of low frequency hearing in partial deafness cochlear implantation (PDCI) using the round window surgical approach) /in:/ Acta Otolaryngolica 2004
 The world's first application of a new method of treatment of partial deafness in children was described by prof. Skarżyński et al. in two world scientific journals:
 Skarzyński Henryk; Lorens Artur; Piotrowska Anna; Anderson Ilona. Partial deafness cochlear implantation in children. International Journal of Pediatric Otorhinolaryngology 71(9):1407-13 (2007)
 Skarzynski H, Lorens A. Cochlear Implants and Hearing Preservation. Electric Acoustic Stimulation in Children W: Van de Heyning P, Kleine Punte A (eds): Cochlear Implants and Hearing Preservation. Adv Otorhinolaryngol. Basel, Karger, 2010, vol 67, pp 135–143 
 Shulman A. Tinnitus: Pathophysiology and Treatment Volume 166 (Progress in Brain Research). Int Tinnitus J. 2009;15(1):108-110

External links 
 Nowa Era w Otolaryngologii 
 Works of Henryk Skarzynski in PubMed
 Biography Henryk Skarzynski
 Polska liderem badan sluchu
 Nagroda xxi wieku dla IFPS
 W swiecie ciszy 
 http://www.henrykskarzynski.pl/

Otolaryngologists
Polish surgeons
1954 births
People from Wysokie Mazowieckie County
Living people
Recipients of the Order of Polonia Restituta